The Best Of is the first compilation album by American recording artist CeCe Peniston, released on March 2, 1998 by A&M Records in the overseas. It contains thirteen versions of her hit singles from 1991 to 1997. As the compilation was the singer's closing release under her contract with A&M, it didn't feature any new material. To increase the appeal of the product, the label included alternate, dancefloor remixed takes of Peniston's popular songs from her previous studio albums. Finally (1992), Thought 'Ya Knew (1994) and I'm Movin' On (1996).

The concept of the project was to focus on Peniston's music career as exclusively a dance artist. For that reason, three tracks were omitted from her singles chronology. Ballad "Inside That I Cried", R&B/soul fest "Before I Lay (You Drive Me Crazy)" with featuring JoJo Hailey, and "I'm Not Over You", which was earlier released on short play only in the United States. Surprisingly, the album contains in addition an original version of "If It Should Rain" — a moody, though groove-oriented composition that was released on her last full-length record.

Two songs were promoted on import singles. "Finally (Classic Funk Mix)", also known as "Finally 1997", and "Somebody Else's Guy". The first, however, was primarily issued in support of the 1997 re-release of the singer's debut Finally (from 1992), also made for sale exclusively in Europe, UK and Japan. The second cut was a 1983's hit by/of Jocelyn Brown, which A&M didn't approve for its 1996 release to boost the sale of the singer's fiasco album I'm Movin' On.

Despite a successful chart performance of both singles ("Finally" at number twenty-six on the UK Singles Chart, while "Somebody Else's Guy" at number thirteen), the compilation failed to enter the albums music charts. All retro black and white photographs for the album's booklet, as well as covers, provided Daniela Federici who collaborated with the artist also on the I'm Movin' On session. A video equivalent of the compilation, with music videos of her singles, was not released.

Track listing

Credits and personnel

Promo release
A promo release of the album was issued by dance promotional department of A&M on compact cassette in United Kingdom. Simply entitled only as Best Of, this edition also included all thirteen, mostly remixed tracks. However, it is featuring a unique insert, with a slightly different track list.

Charts

Singles

References

General

Specific

External links
 

CeCe Peniston compilation albums
1998 greatest hits albums
A&M Records compilation albums